The 2019 Formula Renault Eurocup is a multi-event motor racing championship for open wheel, formula racing cars held across Europe. The championship features drivers competing in 1.8 litre Formula Renault single seat race cars that conform to the technical regulations for the championship. The 2019 season is the 29th Eurocup Formula Renault 2.0 season organized by the Renault Sport. The series will visit nine circuits around the Europe, with one overseas round at Abu Dhabi.

The series utilizes Formula 3 chassis for the first time and new 1.8-litre turbocharged engine. Furthermore, the series also introduced Hankook Tires for the first time in its history after a previous long-term partnership with Michelin.

Teams and drivers
On 14 November 2018, a provisional entry list of ten teams was released. Fortec Motorsports left the series, while BhaiTech Racing, FA Racing by Drivex and M2 Competition have joined the series for the first time. In December 2018, Josef Kaufmann Racing announced it would be withdrawing from the championship.

Calendar
The provisional calendar for the 2019 season was announced on 18 October 2018. The calendar was finalised on 11 December 2018 with introduction of the Yas Marina Circuit as first non-European venue in the Eurocup history. Red Bull Ring round was dropped from the calendar.

Results

Championship standings

Points system
Points were awarded to the top 10 classified finishers.

Drivers' championship

Teams' championship
Only two-best cars are eligible to score points in the teams' championship.

Notes

References

External links
 

Formula Renault Eurocup
Formula Renault Eurocup
Formula Renault Eurocup
Eurocup
Renault Eurocup